A nutshell is the outer shell of a nut.

Nutshell may also refer to:
 Nut graph, a nutshell paragraph explaining the context of a story
 Nutshell (program), a data engine in the early 1980s, succeeded by FileMaker
 Nutshell (band), a folk group from Great Britain
 Nutshell (novel), a 2016 novel by English author Ian McEwan
 "Nutshell" (song), a song by Alice in Chains
 The Nutshell, a pub in Bury St Edmunds, Suffolk, England
 "The Nutshell" (The Avengers), a television episode